The Polish Yachting Association is the national governing body for the sport of sailing in Poland, recognised by the International Sailing Federation.

In 1969 along with Les Glénans - France, Yacht Club de Morges - Switzerland, Casa di Vela Caprera - Italy, National Schools Sailing Association - UK, Centro Internacional de Navigacion de Arousa - Spain, Les Glénans co-founded the International Sailing Schools Association in London, sometimes stated as Paris.

Notable sailors
See :Category:Polish sailors

Olympic sailing
See :Category:Olympic sailors of Poland

Offshore sailing
See :Category:Polish sailors (sport)

Yacht Clubs
See :Category:Yacht clubs in Poland

References

External links
 Official website

Poland
Sailing
Sailing
1924 establishments in Poland